Leptoderma macrophthalmum is a species of slickheads found in the Atlantic Ocean.  

References

Alepocephalidae
Taxa named by Ingvar Byrkjedal
Taxa named by Jan Yde Poulsen
Taxa named by John K. Galbraith (ichthyologist)
Fish described in 2011